Witch-Finder General is the self-styled title of English witch hunter Matthew Hopkins (c. 1620–1647).

Witchfinder General may also refer to:
 Witchfinder General (band), a British heavy metal band
 Witchfinder General (film), a 1968 motion picture starring Vincent Price, based on Bassett's novel
 Witchfinder General (novel), a 1966 novel by Ronald Bassett
 "Witchfinder General", a song on Witchfinder General's 1982 album Death Penalty
 "Witchfinder General", a song by Saxon from the 2004 album Lionheart
A sketch in the TV series Sorry, I've Got No Head
Tamacti Jun, a fictional character in the TV series See

See also
Witchfinder (disambiguation)
Witch hunt (disambiguation)
Witch hunter (disambiguation)
Witch trial (disambiguation)